This is a comprehensive list of streets and squares in Gràcia, a district of Barcelona, Catalonia, Spain.

A
Abdó Terradas,c arrer de
Adrià Gual, plaça d'
Agramunt, carrer d'
Alba, carrer d'
Albigesos, carrer dels
Alfonso Comín, plaça d'
Alió, carrer de
Alzina, carrer de l'
Amunt, passeig d'
Àngel, carrer de l'
Anna Frank, plaça d'
Antequera, carrer d'
Apel·les Fenosa, carrer d'
Apel·les Mestres, carrer d'
Argentera, carrer d'
Ariosto, carrer d'
Astúries, carrer de
August Font, carrer d'
Aulèstia i Pijoan, carrer d'

B
Badia, carrer de
Bailèn, carrer de
Banyoles, carrer de
Beat Almató, carrer del
Bellver, carrer de
Benet Mercadé, carrer de
Berga, carrer de
Betània, carrer de
Betlem, carrer de
Bolívar, carrer de
Bonavista, carrer de
Bretón de los Herreros, carrer de
Bruniquer, carrer de

C
Ca l'Alegre, carrer de
Camèlies, carrer de les
Camil Oliveras, passatge de
Camprodon, carrer de
Canó, carrer del
Capellades, carre de
Cardener, carrer de
Carmel, carretera del
Carolines, carrer de les
Castellterçol, carrer de
Caterina Albert, jardins de
Cesare Cantú, carrer de
Cigne, carrer del
Ciudad Real, carrer de
Clavell, carrer del
Coll del Portell, avinguda del
Congost, carrer del
Còrsega, carrer de
Creueta del Coll, parc de la

D
Dalt, ronda de
Dalt, travessera de
Diamant, plaça del
Doctor Rizal, carrer del
Dolors Lleonart, carrer de
Domènech, carrer de
Duran i Borrell, carrer de

E
Encarnació, carrer de l'
Enric Clarasó, carrer d'
Escorial, carrer de l'
Església, carrer de l'
Esparreguera, carrer d'
Esteve Terradas, carrer de

F
Ferrer de Blanes, carrer de
Font del Remei, carre de la
Francesc Tarrafa, carrer de
Francisco Giner, carrer de
Fraternitat, carrer de la
Frigola, passatge

G
Goldoni, carrer de
Gòlgota, carrer del
Goya, carrer de
Gràcia, carrer de
Gràcia, travessera de
Gran de Gràcia, carrer
Granja, carrer de la
Grassot, carrer d'en
Grau Miró, plaça de	
Güell, Parc
Guillem Abiell, passatge de
Guilleries, carrer de
Guinardó, ronda del
Gutenberg, carrer de

H
Haití, carrer d'
Hipòlit Lázaro, carrer d'

I
Igualada, carrer d'
Indústria, carrer de la

J
Jaén, carrer de
Jaume Cabrera, carrer de
Jesús, carrer de
Joanic, plaça de
Joaquim Ruyra, carrer de
John Lennon, plaça de
Josep Maria Jujol, carrer de
Josep Jover, carrer de

L
Laguna Lanao, carrer de
La Plata, carrer de
Larrard, carrer de
Lavallol, passatge de
Legalitat, carrer de la
Leopoldo Alas, carrer de
Lesseps, plaça de
Llibertat, carrer de la
Llibertat, plaça de la
Lliri, carrer del
Llorer, carrer del
Lluís Bonifaç, carrer de
Lluís Vives, carrer de

M
Maduixer, carrer del
Maignon, carrer de
Manlleu, carrer de
Manlleu, passatge de
Manuel Torrente, carrer de
Mare de Déu dels Desemparats, carrer de la
Mare de Déu de Montserrat, avinguda de la
Mare de Déu de la Salut, carrer de la
Maria, carrer de
Mariana, carrer de
Mariana Pineda, carrer de
Martí, carrer de
Maspons, carre de
Mateu, carrer de
Matilde, carrer de
Maurici Serrahima, carrer de
Mediona, carrer de
Mercedes, carrer de
Mercedes, passatge de
Mercedes, rambla de
Mestre Balcells, jardins del
Mig, Ronda del
Milà i Fontanals, carrer de
Milà i Fontanals, plaça de
Milton, carrer de
Minerva, carrer de
Ministral, passatge
Molist, carrer de
Monistrol, carrer de
Montserrat, placeta de
Montmany, carrer de
Montornès, carrer de
Móra d'Ebre, carrer de
Móra la Nova, carrer de
Mossèn Masdedexart, carrer de
Mozart, carrer de

N
Napoleó, passatge de
Nàpols, carrer de
Narcís Oller, plaça de
Navata, carrer de
Nicolás Salmerón, plaça de
Nil Fabra, carrer de
Nogués, carrer de
Nord, plaça del

O
Olèrdola, plaça d'
Otília Castellvi, carrer d'

P
Palma de Sant Genís, carrer de
Palou, carrer de
Pas de l'Àngel
Pare Jacint Alegre, carrer del
Pare Laínez, carrer del
Carrer del Penedès
Penitents, carrer de
Pere Llobet, carrer de
Pere Serafí, carrer de
Pérez Galdós, carrer de
Perill, carrer del
Perla, carrer de la
Pi i Margall, carrer de
Poble Romaní, plaça del
Pompeu Fabra, avinguda de
Portell, carrer del
Prat, rambla de
Profeta, carrer del
Progrès, carrer del
Providència, carre de la
Puigmartí, carrer de

Q
Quevedo, carrer de

R
Rabassa, carrer de
Ramis, carrer de
Ramón i Cajal, carrer de
Raspall, plaça de
Reig i Bonet, carrer de
Revolució de Setembre de 1808, plaça de la
Riera de can Toda, carrer de
Riera de Sant Miquel, carrer de la
Riera de Vallcarca, carrer de
Rius i Taulet, plaça de
Robí, carrer del
Roger de Flor, carrer de	
Romans, carre de
Ròmul Bosch, passatge de
Ros, carrer de
Ros de Olano, carrer de
Rosella, carrer de la
Rovira i Trias, plaça de
Rubens, carrer de

S
Sagrada Família, passatge de las
Salines, carrer de les
Salvador Alarma, carrer de
Salvador Espriu, jardins de
Samsó, carrer de
Sanllehy, plaça
Santa Àgata, carrer de
Santa Clotilde, carrer de
Santa Creu, carrer de la
Santa Elionor, carrer de
Santa Eugènia, carrer de
Santa Magdalena, carrer de
Santa Rosa, carrer de
Santa Tecla, carrer de
Santa Teresa, carrer de
Sant Agustí,c arrer de
Sant Antoni, travessera de
Sant Antoni Maria Claret, carrer de
Sant Cristòfol, carrer de
Sant Cugat, carrer de
Sant Domènec, carrer de
Sant Joan, passeig de
Sant Josep Cottolengo, carrer de
Sant Josep de la Muntanya, passatge de
Sant Lluc, plaça de
Sant Lluís, carrer de
Sant Marià, baixada de
Sant Onofre, carrer de
Sant Pere Màrtir, carrer de
Sant Salvador, carre de
Secretari Coloma, carrer del
Sedeta, jardins de la
Sèneca, carrer de
Sicília, carrer de
Siracusa, carrer de
Sol, plaça del
Solanell, baixada de
Sors, carrer de

T
Tagamanent, carrer de
Terol, carrer de
Terrassa, carrer de
Ticià, carrer de
Tirso, carrer de
Tona, plaça de
Topazi, carrer del
Tordera, carrer de
Torrent de les Flors, carrer del
Torrent de Mariner, carrer del
Torrent de l'Olla, carrer del
Torrent d'en Vidalet, carrer del
Torrijos, carrer de
Les Tres Senyores, carrer de
Trilla, carrer de
Trilla, plaça de

U
Uruguai, carrer d'

V
Vallcarca, avinguda de
Vallcarca, viaducte de
Vall d'Hebron, passeig de la
Valldoreix, carrer de
Vallès, carrer del
Vallfogona, carrer de
Vallpar, carrer de
Veciana, carrer de
Velázquez, carrer de
Ventalió, carrer de
Venus, carrer de
Verdi, carrer de
Verntallat, carrer de
Viada, carrer de
Vilafranca, carrer de
Virreina, plaça de la

X
Xiquets de Valls, carrer dels

Gracia
Gracia
Streets and squares
Gracia, Barcelona, streets and squares
Gracia, Barcelona, streets and squares